Recchia gemignanii is a species of beetle in the family Cerambycidae. It was described by Lane in 1939.

References

Recchia (beetle)
Beetles described in 1939